

1970

See also
 1970 in Australia

References

External links 
 Australian film at the Internet Movie Database

1970
Australia
Films